The copla is a poetic form of four verses found in many Spanish popular songs as well as in Spanish language literature. There is a related musical genre of the same name. The form is also found widely in  Latin America. The name derives from the Latin copula, ("link" or "union").

Coplas normally consist of four verses de arte menor (that is, of no more than eight syllables to a line) of four lines each, either of Spain's most characteristic popular meter, the romance (8- 8a 8- 8a), or of seguidilla (7- 5a 7- 5a) or redondilla (8a 8b 8b 8a).

Although most commonly considered a popular form, it has not been scorned by cultivated writers. Among those who have written coplas are Íñigo López de Mendoza, Marquis of Santillana, Rafael Alberti, Luis de Góngora, Antonio Machado, Jorge Manrique and Federico García Lorca. Manuel Machado wrote of coplas, using the form himself:

The language of the copla is colloquial and direct, although there may also be double entendres, especially for comic or lascivious effect.

Spanish poetry
Poetic forms